Geophis zeledoni is a snake of the colubrid family. It is endemic to Costa Rica.

References

Geophis
Snakes of North America
Reptiles of Costa Rica
Endemic fauna of Costa Rica
Taxa named by Edward Harrison Taylor
Reptiles described in 1954